Law and the Multiverse is a law blog created by attorneys James Daily and Ryan Davidson.  The blog takes a tongue-in-cheek look at the world of comic books and analyses the real-world legal implications of the events portrayed therein.  The blog focuses primarily on common tropes from the DC and Marvel universes, but occasionally looks at more specific topics, such as the Keene Act from the Watchmen series.

Format
Each post is primarily written by either Mr. Daily or Mr. Davidson and occasionally includes commentary from the other author.  The posts are written in a traditional dry style in order to mimic the feeling of law journals and serious legal blogs.  The authors state that their purpose is to simultaneously address situations humorously familiar to comic book fans and interesting legal situations  with the goal of entertaining their readership while educating their fans about the process of law and legal thought.

Recognition
Law and the Multiverse has been featured in print publications such as the New York Times and The Journal Gazette as well as on popular websites such as The Volokh Conspiracy, Boing Boing and Slashdot.  the site receives over 20,000 visits per day.

References

External links 
 Interview with Bloggers James Daily and Ryan Davidson at Abnormal Use

Internet properties established in 2010
American legal websites